Russia-K ( "Russia - Culture") is a Russian nationwide not-for-profit television channel that broadcasts shows regarding arts and culture. It belongs to the state-controlled VGTRK group.

History
The creation of Kultura channel was authorised on 25 August 1997 after the presidential Decree No. 919 was signed by Boris Yeltsin. Its creation was supported by Mstislav Rostropovich, Dmitry Likhachyov, Rolan Bykov and other public figures. Mikhail Shvydkoy became the first editor-in-chief of Kultura. The channel began broadcasting on 1 November 1997 at 10:00 AM. At the stage of launching, it was planned that it would be called "RTR-2" (while RTR was labeled as RTR-1). The corresponding logo was briefly used in a number of printed TV programs, while the stylized "K" letter was used as the logo from the beginning of broadcast.

The channel was rebranded as Russia-Culture (Rossiya-K) on 1 January 2010 along with three other main channels of the VGTRK group.

The channel re-transmitted Euronews European news channel from 2 October 2001 to 3 September 2017. From 2007 until 2010, it broadcast children's programming produced by Bibigon. Sergey Shumakov has been the editor-in-chief since 2009. The TV channel does not broadcast advertisements, but it promotes cultural events.

Programming
The channel specializes in programs about Russian and world history, science, literature, music, fine and decorative arts, and architecture. The programs include classical music concerts, operas, ballets, and musical competitions. Among the channel's other programs are culture news, documentaries, lectures by leading domestic and foreign scholars, discussions on various aspects of social life. The channel often features interviews with artists, writers, scientists, politicians, and military figures.

Logos and identities

References

External links

Russian-language television stations in Russia
Television channels and stations established in 1997
1997 establishments in Russia
Commercial-free television networks
Classic television networks